The Dubai City Church is a church in Emirate of Dubai.

History
It was founded in 1999. It now comprises more than 1,000 people from different nationalities, meeting in the Holy Trinity Church Compound in Dubai every Saturday evening.

Église Évangélique de Dubai, the Russian Church of Dubai - attended by people from different nationalities, especially the Russian Community with Worship and Sermons in the Russian language, and The Abu Dhabi City Church are their associated ministries.

See also 
 Christianity in the United Arab Emirates
 Religion in the United Arab Emirates

References

External links
 Dubai Church

Evangelical churches in the United Arab Emirates
Churches in Dubai
1999 establishments in the United Arab Emirates